is a Japanese actress, voice actress, singer and narrator from Tokyo, Japan. She is best known in Japan for her voice work in the long running children's series Soreike! Anpanman; her most famous role in the English-speaking world, however, is probably as the Chinese Amazon Shampoo in Ranma ½. Other popular roles include Yōko Sakakibara  in Azuki-chan, Mariemaia Khushrenada in New Mobile Report Gundam Wing: Endless Waltz, My Melody in Onegai My Melody and Mini-Doras in the Doraemon 1979 anime series

Filmography

Television animationThe Story of Pollyanna, Girl of Love (1986), Sadie DeanTales of Little Women (1987), Amy MarchMami the Psychic (1987), Kaori HanaCity Hunter 2 (1988), Azusa NakayamaF (1988), RuikoSoreike! Anpanman (1988), Batako-sanRanma ½ (1989), ShampooDash! Yonkuro (1989), Rinko SumeragiMoomin (1990), Little MyMiracle Girls (1993), Rumiko DaijōjiDoraemon (1994), Mini-Doras2112: The Birth of Doraemon (1995), Mother Eagle CenterAzuki-chan (1995), Yōko SakakibaraCase Closed (1997), Yoshino SatomiHakugei: Legend of the Moby Dick (1997), LisaPokémon (1997), Sakura, YukiTrigun (1998), MarianneThe Mysterious Cities of Gold (1998 Japanese re-dub; the original role in 1982 was performed by Mami Koyama), ZiaBomberman B-Daman Bakugaiden (1998), Akabon (Red Bomber)Bomberman B-Daman Bakugaiden V (1999), Akabon (Red Bomber)Cardcaptor Sakura (1999), The Dark, The LightSeraphim Call (1999), Ayaka RindohGregory Horror Show (1999), Angel Dog/Devil DogInfinite Ryvius (1999), NeyaMagic User's Club (1999), Mizuha MiyamaGate Keepers (2000), Youko OnoHamtaro (2000), Mafurā-chanBaby Felix (2001), MajorinaCase Closed (2001), Kikuyo KasamaHikaru no Go (2001), Akiko ToyaPokémon (2001), LisaPlease Teacher! (2002), Konoha EdajimaHanada Shōnen Shi (2002), ShizueJing: King of Bandits (2002), SherryTenchi Muyo! GXP (2002), Funaho Masaki JuraiGalaxy Angel AA (2003), RebeccaSonic X (2003), MomoMermaid's Forest (2003), MisaCase Closed (2004), Akiko ShiinaBlack Jack (2004), RitsukoGinga Legend Weed (2005), SakuraGlass Mask (2005), Saeko MizukiOnegai My Melody (2005), My MelodyBlack Jack 21 (2006), MaureenAh! My Goddess: Flights of Fancy (2006), PeorthKemonozume (2006), Harumi KamitsukiGolgo 13 (2008), Stella GlastonA Certain Magical Index (2010), Lidvia LorenzettiHeartCatch PreCure! (2010), Tsukikage HarunaJewelpet Twinkle (2010), EkaniteLilpri (2010), Queen of FairylandNo. 6 (2011), KaranIs This a Zombie? of the Dead (2012), Delusion YūPokémon: XY (2015), YashioThe Ancient Magus' Bride (2017), Morii
Unknown date
Midori Morishima in Shukan StorylandTheatrical animationFair, then Partly Piggy (1988), Tama-chanThe Five Star Stories (1989), Fatima ClothoKiki's Delivery Service (1989), JijiRecord of Lodoss War (1990), FiannaComet in Moominland (1992), Little MyWaring Goldfish! The Movie (1992), GyopoMobile Suit Gundam 0083: The Afterglow of Zeon (1992), Nina PurpletonDoraemon: Nobita and the Tin Labyrinth (1993), Mrs. GalionCrayon Shin-chan: Unkokusai's Ambition (1995), Snow Storm RingElementalors (1995), TsuyuhaDoraemon: Nobita and the Galaxy Super-express (1996), Car sensorViolinist of Hameln (1996), SizerGundam Wing: Endless Waltz Special Edition (1997), Mariemaia KushrenadaAh! My Goddess: The Movie (2000), PeorthDoraemon: A Grandmother's Recollections (2000), Young ShizukaDoki Doki Wildcat Engine (2000), Mini-DoraSpace Pirate Captain Herlock: The Endless Odyssey (2002), Kei YukiGunbuster vs. Diebuster (2006), Kazumi "Onee-sama" AmanoCinnamon the Movie (2007), CappuccinoCrayon Shin-chan: Fierceness That Invites Storm! The Hero of Kinpoko (2008), ChitaiDoraemon: The Record of Nobita's Spaceblazer (2009), ChamiiA Whisker Away (2020), TamakiCrayon Shin-chan: Shrouded in Mystery! The Flowers of Tenkazu Academy (2021), Otsumun

OVAGunbuster (1988), Kazumi "Onee-sama" AmanoHades Project Zeorymer (1988), Si AenAngel Cop (1989), Peace (Reika Yogawa)Blue Sonnet (1989), Naru HaibaraGuardian of Darkness (1990), Motoko TakaraSol Bianca (1990), April BikirkEarthian (1990), BlairMobile Suit Gundam 0083: Stardust Memory (1991), Nina PurpletonBastard!! (1993), Thunder Empress Arshes NeiDragon Half (1993), VinaJoJo's Bizarre Adventure (1993), Holly JoestarNew Dominion Tank Police (1993), Leona OzakiCombustible Campus Guardress (1994), AoiCosmic Fantasy (1994), BergaTenchi Muyo! Ryo-Ohki (1995), Funaho Masaki Jurai801 T.T.S. Airbats (1996), Lieutenant JegerMutant Turtles: Superman Legend (1996), Crys-Mu / Dark MuAgent Aika (1997), Aika SumeragiGundam Wing: Endless Waltz (1997), Mariemaia KhushrenadaNight Warriors: Darkstalkers' Revenge (1997), Morrigan AenslandAlien Nine (2001), Principal Chisa Okada, Tomoya HironakaMemories Off 5: Togireta Film (2006), Mizuho AmamiyaAh! My Goddess: Fighting Wings (2007), PeorthAh! My Goddess: Together Forever (2011), Peorth

Video gamesYU-NO: A Girl Who Chants Love at the Bound of this World (1997), Mitsuki IchijouProject Justice (2000), Momo KaruizawaMario Party 3 (2000), Tumble Gregory Horror Show: Soul Collector (2003), Angel Dog/Devil DogFitness Boxing: Fist of the North Star (2022), Yuria

Dubbing
Live-actionA Better Tomorrow II, Jackie Sung (Emily Chu)Schindler's List, Helen Hirsch (Embeth Davidtz)Village of the Damned, Mara Chaffee (Lindsey Haun)The Wicker Man, Sister Willow Woodward (Kate Beahan)

AnimationAngela Anaconda, GordyMoomins on the Riviera, Little MyTiny Toon Adventures, Babs BunnyX-Men, Sara Grey

Other 
Sanrio character ("Cinnamoroll") (Cappuccino)

Drama CD
 Sheeda in GFantasy Comics CD Collection - Fire Emblem: Ankoku Ryuu to Hikari no Ken''

References

External links
 Rei Sakuma at GamePlaza-Haruka Voice Acting Database 
 Rei Sakuma at Hitoshi Doi's Seiyuu Database
 
 

1965 births
Living people
Japanese women singers
Japanese video game actresses
Japanese voice actresses
Voice actresses from Tokyo
20th-century Japanese actresses
21st-century Japanese actresses